The Finnish International Baccalaureate Society ry. (FIBS) is a registered Finnish organisation for both IB students and IB graduates. FIBS members are students who are currently undergoing the International Baccalaureate Diploma Programme within Finland. The organisation's purpose is to advance the recognition of the IB in Finnish institutes of higher education and assist and ease the placement of students into universities. FIBS further aims to uphold the student rights for every IB student, current and past and to keep in contact with all IB institutions in Finland and to achieve corporation. It is also a member of the Finnish Upper Secondary School Students' Union (SLL).

Governing board
FIBS has a board that consists of a chairman and thirteen board members. The chairman and the board are elected at the organisation's fall assembly, which gives everyone who is a registered student with SLL the right to vote.

The current board:

Chairman Matti Kaira 
Vice-Chairman Maria Del Mar Garcia Sierra
Secretary Wilma Guest 
Treasurer Aleksi Lehtonen
Events Managers Amanda Harmaala, Tessa Valle, Hefan Xiao, Lia Alieva 
Students Rights Representatives Jason Hu, Haohao Liu, Aarni Hilden,  
PR and Marketing Managers Cameron Dunn Merelle, Carmen Roux

Achievements
So far, FIBS has managed to convince the University of Helsinki to not require the normally mandatory Swedish examination from IB students. Also, the Helsinki University of Technology allows IB students to apply with their final grades and without entrance examinations if certain criteria are fulfilled; the student had to study Math and Chemistry or Physics at Higher Level and score a minimum of 34 points. Some programs also have maximum quotas for this kind of application. Also, upon requests by FIBS and others, the International Baccalaureate Organization has decided to print umlauts and other non-ASCII characters on IB graduates' diplomas.

External links

Official site of the International Baccalaureate Organization
Official site of the Finnish Upper Secondary School Students' Union

International Baccalaureate schools in Finland
Education in Finland